Canidelo may refer to the following places in Portugal:

Canidelo, Vila do Conde, a parish in the municipality of Vila do Conde
Canidelo, Vila Nova de Gaia, a parish in the municipality of Vila Nova de Gaia